In computing cooperative distributed problem solving is a network of semi-autonomous processing nodes working together to solve a problem, typically in a multi-agent system. That is concerned with the investigation of problem subdivision, sub-problem distribution, results synthesis, optimisation of problem solver coherence and co-ordination. It is closely related to distributed constraint programming and distributed constraint optimization; see the links below.

Aspects of CDPS
 Neither global control or global data storage – no individual CDPS problem solver (agent) has sufficient information to solve the entire problem.
 Control and data are distributed
 Communication is slower than computation, therefore:
 Loose coupling between problem solvers
 Efficient protocols (not too much communication overhead)
 problems should be modular, coarse grained
 Any unique node is a potential bottleneck
 Organised behaviour is hard to guarantee since no one node has the complete picture

See also
 Multiscale decision making
 Distributed constraint optimization
 Distributed artificial intelligence
 Multi-agent planning

Some relevant books
  A chapter in an edited book.
 
  See Chapters 1 and 2; downloadable free online.
 

Applications of distributed computing
Problem solving